In biochemistry, a Hanes–Woolf plot, Hanes plot, or plot of  against ,  is a graphical representation of enzyme kinetics in which the ratio of the initial substrate concentration  to the reaction velocity  is plotted against .  It is based on the rearrangement of the Michaelis–Menten equation shown below:

J B S Haldane stated, reiterating what he and K. G. Stern had written in their  book, that this rearrangement was due to Barnet Woolf. However, it was just one of three transformations   introduced by Woolf, who did not use it as the basis of a plot. There is therefore no strong reason for attaching his name to it. It was first published by C. S. Hanes, though he did not use it as plot either.

Starting from the Michaelis–Menten equation:

we can take reciprocals of both sides of the equation to obtain the equation underlying the Lineweaver–Burk plot:

 · 

which can be rearranged to express a different straight-line relationship:

which can be rearranged to give

 · 

Like other techniques that linearize the Michaelis–Menten equation, the Hanes–Woolf plot was used historically for rapid determination of the kinetic parameters ,  and ', but it has been largely superseded by nonlinear regression methods that are significantly more accurate and no longer computationally inaccessible. It remains useful, however, as a means to present data graphically.

See also
 Michaelis–Menten kinetics
 Lineweaver–Burk plot
 Eadie–Hofstee diagram

References

Plots (graphics)
Enzyme kinetics